Final mix may refer to:

 "Final Mix", an episode of Code Lyoko.
 Kingdom Hearts Final Mix, an alternate version of the Kingdom Hearts game.
 Kingdom Hearts II Final Mix+, an alternate version of the Kingdom Hearts II game.
 The product of Audio mixing (recorded music)